The United States Air Force maintains a number of civil engineering units in the form of United States Air Force civil engineering squadrons. In wartime, they provide for the rapid repair of damage to airfields and other critical facilities. In peacetime, they maintain and construct bases for the air force to operate out of.

Some of these units are organized as Rapid Engineer Deployable Heavy Operational Repair Squadron Engineers (RED HORSE) and others as Prime Base Engineer Emergency Force (PRIME BEEF) units.

List

See also
List of United States Air Force squadrons

References

Civil engineering